Adeera Levin MD, FRCPC is a Professor of Medicine, and is head of the Division of Nephrology at University of British Columbia.

Education and early career 
Levin earned a BSc degree at University of Toronto (1977–81) and an MD at McMaster University Medical School (1981–84). She stayed on as an Internal Medicine Resident, before moving to Henderson General Hospital (now Juravinski Hospital) to become Chief Medical Resident in 1986. She was a Clinical Fellow in Nephrology at Toronto Western Hospital & St. Michael's Hospital (Toronto). She was then a Clinical Research Fellow in Nephrology starting in 1988.

Research 
Her primary area of interest is looking at risk factors in chronic kidney disease (CKD) patients.

She is also the Principal investigator of the CAN SOLVE CKD grant award.

Other positions 
 President of International Society of Nephrology (2015–2017)
 Former editor-in-Chief of Canadian Journal of Kidney Health & Disease
 Consultant nephrologist at Providence Health Care/St. Paul's Hospital
 Executive Director of the BC Provincial Renal Agency

Awards 
 2013 – Canadian Society of Nephrology Outstanding Contributions to Canadian Nephrology
 2014 – Kidney Foundation of Canada Research medal of Excellence
 2014 – Fellowship of the Canadian Academy of Health Sciences
 2015 – National Kidney Foundation’s International Distinguished Medal
 2015 – Aubrey J Tingle Research Award from the Michael Smith Foundation for Health Research
 2015 – The Order of Canada

Selected publications 
 
 Co-author of textbook: “Chronic Kidney Disease: a practical guide to understanding and management”,

References

External links 
 
 PubMed

Living people
Year of birth missing (living people)
Canadian women physicians
21st-century Canadian women scientists
University of Toronto alumni
McMaster University alumni
Academic staff of the University of British Columbia
Canadian nephrologists
Members of the Order of Canada
Fellows of the Canadian Academy of Health Sciences